FC Agro Chișinău was a Moldovan football club based in Chișinău. It played in the Moldovan National Division from 1992 to 2004. It was dissolved in 2005.

History
Founded as Constructorul Chișinău in 1990, the club was renamed Constructorul-Agro Chișinău in 1992, and then Agro Chișinău in 1993. After being relegated from the Moldovan National Division in 2004, the club was renamed Agro-Goliador Chișinău.

Recent history

Notable coaches
 Yuri Gavrilov (player-manager)

References

External links
 Profile at weltfussballarchiv 
 Profile at foot.dk 

Defunct football clubs in Moldova
Football clubs in Chișinău
Association football clubs established in 1990
Association football clubs disestablished in 2005
1990 establishments in the Moldavian Soviet Socialist Republic
2005 disestablishments in Moldova
Football clubs in the Moldavian Soviet Socialist Republic